In number theory, a juggler sequence is an integer sequence that starts with a positive integer a0, with each subsequent term in the sequence defined by the recurrence relation:

Background
Juggler sequences were publicised by American mathematician and author Clifford A. Pickover. The name is derived from the rising and falling nature of the sequences, like balls in the hands of a juggler.

For example, the juggler sequence starting with a0 = 3 is

If a juggler sequence reaches 1, then all subsequent terms are equal to 1. It is conjectured that all juggler sequences eventually reach 1. This conjecture has been verified for initial terms up to 106, but has not been proved. Juggler sequences therefore present a problem that is similar to the Collatz conjecture, about which Paul Erdős stated that "mathematics is not yet ready for such problems".

For a given initial term n, one defines l(n) to be the number of steps which the juggler sequence starting at n takes to first reach 1, and h(n) to be the maximum value in the juggler sequence starting at n. For small values of n we have:

{| class="wikitable"
|-
! n
! Juggler sequence
! l(n)

! h(n)

|-
| 2
| 2, 1
| align="center" | 1
| align="center" | 2
|-
| 3
| 3, 5, 11, 36, 6, 2, 1
| align="center" | 6
| align="center" | 36
|-
| 4
| 4, 2, 1
| align="center" | 2
| align="center" | 4
|-
| 5
| 5, 11, 36, 6, 2, 1
| align="center" | 5
| align="center" | 36
|-
| 6
| 6, 2, 1
| align="center" | 2
| align="center" | 6
|-
| 7
| 7, 18, 4, 2, 1
| align="center" | 4
| align="center" | 18
|-
| 8
| 8, 2, 1
| align="center" | 2
| align="center" | 8
|-
| 9
| 9, 27, 140, 11, 36, 6, 2, 1
| align="center" | 7
| align="center" | 140
|-
| 10
| 10, 3, 5, 11, 36, 6, 2, 1
| align="center" | 7
| align="center" | 36
|}

Juggler sequences can reach very large values before descending to 1. For example, the juggler sequence starting at a0 = 37 reaches a maximum value of 24906114455136. Harry J. Smith has determined that the juggler sequence starting at a0 = 48443 reaches a maximum value at a60 with 972,463 digits, before reaching 1 at a157.

See also
 Arithmetic dynamics
 Collatz conjecture
 Recurrence relation

References

External links

Juggler sequence (A094683) at the On-Line Encyclopedia of Integer Sequences. See also:
Number of steps needed for juggler sequence (A094683) started at n to reach 1.
n sets a new record for number of iterations to reach 1 in the juggler sequence problem.
Number of steps where the Juggler sequence reaches a new record.
Smallest number which requires n iterations to reach 1 in the juggler sequence problem.
Starting values that produce a larger juggler number than smaller starting values.
Juggler sequence calculator at Collatz Conjecture Calculation Center 
Juggler Number pages by Harry J. Smith

Arithmetic dynamics
Integer sequences
Recurrence relations
Unsolved problems in number theory